Dächingen (Daechingen) is a village on the Swabian Alb located next to the town of Ehingen (Donau), approximately 25 km. southwest of Ulm in the Alb-Donau district in Baden-Württemberg, Germany.

Towns in Baden-Württemberg
Alb-Donau-Kreis
Württemberg